The premier of Saskatchewan, Canada, is the province's head of government since 1905. Saskatchewan uses a unicameral Westminster-style parliamentary government, in which the premier is the leader of the party that has the support of a majority in the Legislative Assembly. The premier chooses a cabinet from the elected members to form the Executive Council of Saskatchewan, and presides over that body.

Members are first elected to the legislature during general elections. General elections must be conducted every five years from the date of the last election, but the premier may ask for early dissolution of the legislative assembly. An election may also happen if the governing party loses the confidence of the legislature, by the defeat of a supply bill or passage of a non-confidence motion.

Prior to 1905, Saskatchewan was part of the North-West Territories and was governed by the lieutenant-governor of the North-West Territories from 1870 until 1897, and the premier of the North-West Territories from 1897 to 1905.

List of premiers

|-
|colspan="10"|Premiers of the North-West Territories

|-
|colspan="10"|Premiers of Saskatchewan

See also
List of premiers of Saskatchewan by time in office
List of leaders of the opposition in Saskatchewan
For more lists of this type, see Lists of incumbents.

References

Saskatchewan

Premiers